Apache Chief is a Native American superhero from the various Hanna-Barbera Super Friends cartoons and the DC comic book series of the same name. He was one of the new heroes added (along with Black Vulcan, Rima the Jungle Girl, El Dorado and Samurai) to increase the number of non-white characters in the Super Friends' ranks. The visual look of the character was created by cartoonist Alex Toth, who designed many superheroes for Hanna-Barbera beginning in the 1960s. He was voiced by Michael Rye in most of his appearances, Regis Cordic in his debut appearance, and Al Fann in "History of Doom".

In the Challenge of the Super Friends series, Apache Chief was seen in every episode except one, but had spoken lines in only nine out of the sixteen episodes of the series. His arch-enemy from the Legion of Doom was Giganta, who was originally an enemy of Wonder Woman.

Fictional character biography
Apache Chief's origin, shown as a recording in the episode "History of Doom", was thus: while still a young brave, he went for a walk with a Native American Elder, who was also his mentor. The two men are quickly attacked by a grizzly bear, but the Elder, recognizing that the young brave might be ready for a test such as this, gives the younger man a pouch of a special magic powder which will amplify the user's thoughts and abilities a hundredfold. The young man resolves to be strong and brave (heeding the Elder's advice that whatever is in his mind at the time will be amplified by the powder), and upon sprinkling himself with the powder and invoking the magic phrase grows to fifty feet in size, becoming stronger and braver. He disposes of the bear without violence, proving that he has passed the test. However, a girl horseback riding witnesses the entire affair, hoping to use the powder to become big and famous, and uses her lasso to steal the pouch. Despite the Elder telling her that her thoughts were evil, she uses the magic powder on herself and becomes the evil Giganta, proclaiming: "The Medicine Man was right, Apache Chief! Your fifty feet of good are now matched by my fifty feet of evil!"

Powers and abilities
By speaking the words "inuk chuk" (most likely a reference to the inuksuk, giant stone figures built by various Arctic tribes that are depicted on the territorial flag of Nunavut), Apache Chief could grow to unlimited sizes. In the episode "Colossus", Apache Chief grows to many times the size of the Earth, making himself able to battle the Colossus, a titanic space creature that plucked Earth from its orbit and placed it in a small (relative to him) glass bottle. Originally his tribal powers limited his growth to only 50 feet tall, but in one episode, "Man in the Moon", he used the Atom's knowledge of atomic size and was able to increase his growing to unlimited size. He was then able to grow to 1/5 the size of the earth, with one foot the size of the entire eastern United States and defeated the creature, sending it back inside the moon. He also spoke in stereotypical "Native American English" and recited vaguely Native American philosophy. In the 1978 episodes "Revenge on Gorilla City" and "The Time Trap", and the 1984 short episode entitled "The Village of Lost Souls", Apache Chief also has exceptional tracking ability.

Other versions
In the comics, a somewhat similar character called Manitou Raven was created, as an homage to him, and joined the canonical JLA. Both Manitou Raven and his widow, Manitou Dawn, have been shown to use "inuk chuk" when casting spells or invoking powers.

In other media

Television
 Apache Chief appears in The All-New Super Friends Hour, voiced initially by Regis Cordic and later by Michael Rye.
 Apache Chief appears in Challenge of the Super Friends, voiced again by Michael Rye.
 Apache Chief appears in Harvey Birdman, Attorney at Law, voiced by Maurice LaMarche. This version has taken on various odd jobs in addition to his superheroics and, in later appearances, develops a fear of coffee and other such hot liquids. In his most notable appearance in the episode "Very Personal Injury", he and Black Vulcan, among others, form the "Multicultural Pals".
 A character inspired by Apache Chief named Long Shadow appears in Justice League Unlimited, voiced by Gregg Rainwater. Possessing enhanced hearing along with Apache Chief's ability to increase his size and strength, Long Shadow is a selfless genetically-engineered superhero created by Project Cadmus to serve as a member of their Ultimen and work independently of the Justice League, though the former group are led to believe that they are regular metahumans. In the episode "Ultimatum", the Ultimen have several encounters with the League, during which Long Shadow expresses interest in joining them and catches Wonder Woman's attention while his teammates focus on reaping material rewards for their work. After discovering the truth behind their creation and that they are suffering from cellular breakdown, Long Shadow reluctantly joins the other Ultimen in attacking their manager, Maxwell Lord, in an attempt to find Cadmus member Amanda Waller until Long Shadow defects to the League and helps them defeat his former teammates. Cadmus retakes custody of most of the Ultimen, but Wonder Woman and Batman convince them to let Long Shadow remain with the League for his final days. In the episode "Panic in the Sky", Cadmus utilizes an army of Ultimen clones in their siege on the League's Watchtower.
 Characters inspired by Long Shadow and Apache Chief named Tye Longshadow and Holling Longshadow appear in Young Justice, voiced by Gregg Rainwater and Michael Horse respectively. The latter is an elderly Native American who lives in an RV park called Happy Trails while the former is his grandson, both of whom are descended from a long line of Apache chiefs. Additionally, Tye is a friend of Jaime Reyes. While running away from home, Tye is captured and experimented on by the Reach, who activate his meta-gene, granting him the ability to project an "astral" version of himself that can grow several stories tall. The Team rescue Tye and his fellow captives and place some of them in S.T.A.R. Labs' custody, but he joins Virgil Hawkins, Asami Koizumi, and Ed Dorado in escaping. In the process, they are unknowingly manipulated by Lex Luthor into helping the Light until Arsenal reveals the truth to the four. After helping the Team and the Justice League thwart the Reach's invasion of Earth, Tye returns to his regular life to live with his mother. As of the third season, Tye and Asami have begun dating.

Film
 Apache Chief makes a cameo appearance in Scooby-Doo! Mask of the Blue Falcon.
 Apache Chief makes a cameo appearance in The Lego Batman Movie.

Parodies
Apache Chief makes a cameo appearance in the Family Guy episode "PTV".

Toys
 Apache Chief serves as the "Collect & Connect" build-a-figure in series 18 of Mattel's DC Universe Classics.
 Apache Chief received a Lego minifigure in The Lego Batman Movie tie-in toy line.

References

Characters created by Alex Toth
DC Comics American superheroes
DC Comics superheroes
DC Comics characters who are shapeshifters
Fictional Apache people
Fictional characters who can change size
Fictional characters with precognition
Fictional giants
Super Friends characters
Television characters introduced in 1977